Neranwood is a suburb in the City of Gold Coast, Queensland, Australia. In the  Neranwood had a population of 67 people.

History
The name Neranwood is a contraction of the name of the Nerang Hardwood Company which established a sawmill in the area in 1923.

Neranwood Provisional School opened on 15 June 1925 and closed on 31 December 1928.

A private tramway was built to transport the timber from the sawmill to the railway siding at Mudgeeraba. It had two locomotives called Alison and Kathleen. However, the project was not economically viable and the sawmill and tramway closed in 1928. Local people used the tramway sleepers for firewood.

A telephone and telegraph office was established in 1924.

In the  Neranwood had a population of 67 people.

Education 
There are no schools in Neranwood. The nearest primary school is Mudgeeraba Creek State School in neighbouring Mudgeeraba to the north-east. The nearest secondary school is Robina State High School in Robina to the north-east.

Amenities 
There are a number of parks in the area:

 Little Nerang Dam
 Neranwood Park

 Numinbah Reserve

 Waterworks Reserve Austinville

See also
 List of tramways in Queensland

References

External links
 

Suburbs of the Gold Coast, Queensland